Best Supporting Actress may refer to one of many awards, including:

 Academy Award for Best Supporting Actress
 AACTA International Award for Best Supporting Actress
 Black Reel Award: Best Supporting Actress
 Blue Dragon Film Award for Best Supporting Actress
 Boston Society of Film Critics Award for Best Supporting Actress
 Broadcast Film Critics Association Award for Best Supporting Actress
 César Award for Best Supporting Actress
 Citra Award for Best Supporting Actress
 Chicago Film Critics Association Award for Best Supporting Actress
 Dallas-Fort Worth Film Critics Association Award for Best Supporting Actress
 David di Donatello for Best Supporting Actress
 Empire Award for Best Supporting Actress
 Filmfare Award for Best Supporting Actress
 Florida Film Critics Circle Award for Best Supporting Actress
 Golden Calf Award for Best Supporting Actress
 Golden Globe Award for Best Supporting Actress – Motion Picture
 Golden Horse Award for Best Supporting Actress
 Best Supporting Actress (Golden Rooster Awards)
 Goya Award for Best Supporting Actress
 Hong Kong Film Award for Best Supporting Actress
 Hundred Flowers Award for Best Supporting Actress
 Los Angeles Film Critics Association Award for Best Supporting Actress
 National Board of Review Award for Best Supporting Actress
 National Film Award for Best Supporting Actress
 National Society of Film Critics Award for Best Supporting Actress
 New York Film Critics Circle Award for Best Supporting Actress
 Online Film Critics Society Award for Best Supporting Actress
 Polish Academy Award for Best Supporting Actress
 San Diego Film Critics Society Award for Best Supporting Actress
 San Francisco Film Critics Circle Award for Best Supporting Actress
 Satellite Award for Best Supporting Actress – Motion Picture
 Saturn Award for Best Supporting Actress
 St. Louis Gateway Film Critics Association Award for Best Supporting Actress
 Toronto Film Critics Association Award for Best Supporting Actress
 Vancouver Film Critics Circle Award for Best Supporting Actress
 Washington D.C. Area Film Critics Association Award for Best Supporting Actress

See also
 List of awards for supporting actor#Female